The 2005 FIA WTCC Race Of San Marino was the fourth round of the 2005 World Touring Car Championship season. It was held at the Autodromo Enzo e Dino Ferrari. The two races were won by Fabrizio Giovanardi and Dirk Müller.

Report

Qualifying
After a disappointing start to the season with only 13 points from the first three weekends, Fabrizio Giovanardi bounced back in Imola with a dominant pole position for Alfa Romeo after dominating qualifying with a time of 1:58.573. Antonio García was second for BMW nearly six-tenths of a second behind, and SEAT also did a good job with Jordi Gené qualifying third. Two more Alfas driven by Augusto Farfus and Gabriele Tarquini followed ahead of Roberto Colciago who was driving for Honda.

Race 1
Gabriele Tarquini and Peter Terting, who qualified fifth and seventh were both given ten-lace grid penalties for an incident in the previous race and an engine change respectively. García started well and overtook polesitter Fabrizio Giovanardi at the line, with reigning champion Andy Priaulx jumping up to second in his BMW. Championship leader Dirk Müller got the better of second row starters Jordi Gené and Augusto Farfus, with Roberto Colciago and James Thompson, in another Alfa following. Tarquini and Jörg Müller, second and third in the championship, collided which sent the former to the back of the field, and the BMW man had to pit for repairs. At the front, Giovanardi dealt with Priaulx on the first lap, and García on the second, and was never caught again. Colciago overtook Farfus on the same lap, and then tried to do the same on Gené, however there was contact and the Spaniard crashed. Colciago continued, but was passed by Farfus on the next lap. The rest of the race was quiet, with Giovanardi easily winning from García in a lonely second. Priaulx was third ahead of Dirk Müller, Farfus, Colciago, Thompson and Alex Zanardi's BMW. A 12th-place finish was enough for Alessandro Balzan to win the Independent's Trophy.

Race 2
Alex Zanardi started on pole on the reversed grid, and he had no problem converting it into a lead early on. The other BMWs were all very strong off the line, with Dirk Müller, Priaulx and García jumping into 2nd, 3rd and 5th from 5th, 6th and 7th respectively. James Thompson's Alfa, who started 2nd was 4th splitting the BMWs, and his teammates Farfus and Giovanardi were 6th and 8th, with Rickard Rydell's SEAT splitting them. Giovanardi started to move up the order, passing both Rydell and Farfus on the second lap. Zanardi was unable to hold his lead for long, with his teammates Dirk Müller and Priaulx passing him and then pulling away. Behind, there was contact between García and Giovanardi while fighting for fifth, which pushed the Spaniard down the order, whereas Farfus took advantage and passed a rattled Giovanardi two laps later. Dirk Müller and Priaulx ran comfortably at the front, with the Englishman despite staying with a second, not able to make an impression on his teammate. Thompson in fourth had just started to put pressure on Zanardi when he made a mistake and was passed by his two teammates, Rydell and Jason Plato in another SEAT. There was contact with the latter, which sent Thompson packing down the order. Dirk Müller took his second win of the season, with Priaulx in second. The battle for third between Zanardi and Farfus reached a head on the final lap, when an overtaking attempt from Farfus resulted in a collision, sending both off the track. Giovanardi thus took third, with Rydell fourth, whereas Farfus rejoined fifth and Zanardi had to settle for sixth, with the SEATS of Peter Terting and Plato completing the points. Neither Gabriele Tarquini nor Jörg Müller was able to get into the points, despite fighting drives. Balzan won the Independent's Trophy after finishing 13th, however he was disqualified for an underweight car, handing it to countryman Stefano D'Aste.

Classification

Race 1

Race 2

Standings after the races

Drivers' Championship standings

Manufacturers' Championship standings

References

External links
 Results booklet from fiawtcc.com archives

San Marino
Race of San Marino